Dhak Khalwara  is a village in Phagwara Tehsil in Kapurthala district of Punjab State, India. The village is administrated by a Sarpanch, who is an elected representative.

Demography 
According to the report published by Census India in 2011, Dhak Khalwara has 188 houses with the total population of 1,011 persons of which 510 are male and 501 females. Literacy rate of Dhak Khalwara is 76.48%, higher than the state average of 75.84%.  The population of children in the age group 0–6 years is 135 which is 13.35% of the total population.  Child sex ratio is approximately 824, lower than the state average of 846.

As per census 2011, 289 people were engaged in work activities out of the total population of Dhak Khalwara which includes 269 males and 20 females. According to census survey report 2011, 93.43% workers (Employment or Earning more than 6 Months) describe their work as main work and 6.57% workers are involved in Marginal activity providing livelihood for less than 6 months.

Population data

Caste  
The village has schedule caste (SC) constitutes 60.53% of total population of the village and it doesn't have any Schedule Tribe (ST) population.

References

External links
  Villages in Kapurthala
 Kapurthala Villages List

Villages in Kapurthala district